Trabala charon is a moth of the family Lasiocampidae, first described by Herbert Druce in 1910. It is found in the Democratic Republic of the Congo, Cameroon, Kenya, Kenya, Malawi, Tanzania, Uganda, Zimbabwe and Zambia.

Biology
Known food plants of this species are Terminalia glaucescens, Terminalia mantaly and Combretum racemosum (Combretaceae).

References
Druce, H. (1910). "Descriptions of some new species of Heterocera from tropical Africa". Annals and Magazine of Natural History. (8)5:393–402.

Lasiocampidae
Moths described in 1910
Moths of Africa